Horizon FM is a radio station in Burkina Faso. It is broadcast in the French language on 102.7 or 104.4 FM from the city of Bobo-Dioulasso. It is known for its late night agony uncle show.

See also
 Media of Burkina Faso

External links

Radio stations in Burkina Faso